The Man from Snowy River II is a 1988 Australian drama film, the sequel to the 1982 film The Man from Snowy River.

It was released in the United States by Walt Disney Pictures as Return to Snowy River, and in the United Kingdom as The Untamed.

Reprising their roles from the first film were Tom Burlinson as Jim Craig and Sigrid Thornton as Jessica Harrison, while Brian Dennehy appeared as Harrison instead of Kirk Douglas.

Plot
Some years after his dangerous ride down the steep mountain to capture the Brumby herd and regain the colt, Jim Craig, now with a large herd of mountain-bred horses of his own, returns to take up with his girl, Jessica Harrison. She is still smitten with him, but opposition from her father remains as resolute as ever.  Further, she also has a rich would-be suitor, Alistair Patton (son of the banker from whom Harrison is seeking a large loan), endeavouring to court her.  Before he returns from Harrison's property to his home, Jim meets an army officer seeking quality horses for the remount service on a regular basis.

As he realizes Jessica's affections remain for Jim, and that she doesn't "give a damn" about him, Patton jealously and maliciously recruits a gang to steal Jim's horses. Jim gives chase and in so doing again rides his horse down the steep mountainside. Patton shoots at him; the horse is killed and Jim is injured but manages to recover and resume the pursuit. Jim had earlier let the wild stallion which led the Brumbies loose into the wild again; in a twist of fate, the stallion shows itself from the wild at this crucial moment, and Jim finally trains the horse that has been the enigma of the entire district for decades.  As Jim breaks him in and learns to ride him, they become friends, and together they catch up to Patton and his gang.

Jessica's father has also relented during this time, and he eventually joins with Jim and his friends to hunt down Patton and his gang. Jim Craig gets and wins his man-on-man duel with Patton, and Harrison gives his final approval for Jessica and Jim to marry.

Cast
 Tom Burlinson as Jim Craig
 Sigrid Thornton as Jessica Harrison
 Brian Dennehy as Harrison
 Nicholas Eadie as Alistair Patton Jr.
 Mark Hembrow as Seb
 Bryan Marshall as Hawker
 Rhys McConnochie as Alistair Patton Sr.
 Peter Cummins as Jake
 Cornelia Frances as Mrs. Darcy
 Tony Barry as Jacko
 Wynn Roberts as Priest
 Alec Wilson as Patton's Croney
 Peter Browne as Reilly
 Alan Hopgood as Simmons
 Mark Pennell as Collins

Production
Geoff Burrowes, who produced the first movie, decided to direct as he felt he would clash with any other director because he felt so strongly about the material.

A horse was injured during the making of the movie and had to be put down. A government inquiry later found, contrary to allegations by the RSPCA, that the horse was put down in the most humane way possible under the circumstances.

Soundtrack

Award and nominations
 Won 1989 APRA Award for Best Original Music Score (soundtrack title Return to Snowy River) — (awarded to Bruce Rowland)
 Nominated for 1988 AFI Award for Best Achievement in Sound
 Nominated for 1989 Motion Picture Sound Editors Golden Reel Award for Best Sound Editing – Sound Effects

Box office
The Man from Snowy River II grossed $7,415,000 at the box office in Australia.

References

External links
 
 
 
 
 
 
 
The Man from Snowy River II at the National Film and Sound Archive
The Man from Snowy River II at Oz Movies

1988 films
Australian Western (genre) films
Films about horses
Films based on poems
The Man from Snowy River
Australian sequel films
1988 Western (genre) films
1988 drama films
Films set in colonial Australia
Walt Disney Pictures films
Films set in the 19th century
1988 directorial debut films
1980s English-language films